The Type 636 and its successor Type 636A hydrographic survey ships is type of Chinese survey and research vessel designed to replace earlier Type 625 and Type 635 research vessels, and is currently in service with the People's Liberation Army Navy and Chinese Coast Guard. Type 636 & 636A has received NATO reporting name Shupang class.

Type 636
Type 636 hydrographic survey ship and its successor Type 636A are both designed by of the 708th Institute of China State Shipbuilding Corporation (CSSC), which is also more commonly known as China Shipbuilding and Oceanic Engineering Design Academy (中国船舶及海洋工程设计研究)  nowadays. Special attention was given to vibration reduction measures and the internal noise generated by the ship itself was much lower than other ships of similar size. The ship was built by Wuhu Shipyard and entered service in August 1998. On November 16, 2011, it was transferred to Chinese Coast Guard. Specification:
Length (m): 129.82
Beam (m): 17
Depth (m): 8.1
Cruise speed (kn): 15
Top speed (kn): 18
Endurance (day): 60
Range (nmi): 15000
Displacement (t): 5872
Max wind scale resistance: 12

Type 636A
Type 636A is the successor of earlier Type 636. Construction of the first ship of Type 636A began at Wuhu Shipyard in May 2003 and there are   more than two dozen surveying systems installed on board. Originally named as Ocean (Haiyang, 海洋) 20, but subsequently changed to Zhu Kezhen. The second ship of Type 636A was originally named as Ocean (Haiyang, 海洋) 22, but subsequently changed to Qian Sanqiang. Specification:*
Length (m): 129.28
Beam (m): 17
Depth (m): 8.1
Cruise speed (kn): 15
Top speed (kn): 17.5
Endurance (day): 60
Range (nmi): 15000 @ 15 kn
Displacement (t): 5883
Crew: 134

Ships
Type 636 and 636A ships are named as contemporary Chinese scientists.

References

Auxiliary ships of the People's Liberation Army Navy
Auxiliary research ship classes